The FMK-3 is a fibreglass cased Argentine anti-tank blast mine. It is produced by Direccion General de Fabricaciones Militares. The mine actually uses a FMK-1 anti-personnel mine as a fuze, the FMK-1 is modified with a pressure cap to increase the activation pressure. Argentina's stock of FMK-1 mines was modified in 2003 to prevent their use as anti-personnel mines, this involved welded an additional plastic pressure cap onto the mine. The mine has very little metal content, although an optional detection ring is provided with the FMK-1.

It is found in the Falkland Islands.

Specifications
 Weight: 7.1 kg
 Explosive content: 6.1 kg of RDX/TNT and Wax
 Length: 250 mm
 Height: 90 mm
 Width: 250 mm
 Operating pressure: 150 to 250 kg. 300 kg (post 2003)

See also
The FMK-5 mine is similar but uses a round case. 
Not to be confused with the FMK-3 submachine gun.

References
 Jane's Mines and Mine Clearance 2005-2006
 

Anti-tank mines
Land mines of Argentina
Fabricaciones Militares